Club Social y Deportivo Defensa y Justicia, commonly known as Defensa y Justicia, is an Argentine football club from Florencio Varela, Buenos Aires, established in 1935. The senior squad currently plays in the Primera División, the top division of the Argentine football league system. 

The team plays its home games at Estadio Norberto Tomaghello, with a capacity of approximately 20,000. Defensa y Justicia is one of the clubs with most seasons in Primera B Nacional, also having played in all the divisions of the Argentine league system since their debut in Primera D Metropolitana in 1978.

In 2016, Defensa y Justicia qualified to play their first international tournament, the 2017 Copa Sudamericana. The team advanced to second stage but then lost to Chapecoense on penalties.

In 2021, the club achieved their first international titles after having won both, 2020 Copa Sudamericana to Lanús and 2021 Recopa Sudamericana beating Palmeiras on penalties. Along with Boca Juniors, Defensa y Justicia is one of the clubs that have not been relegated since their promotion to Primera División.

History 

The institution was founded on 20 March 1935 by a group of friends who wanted to form a local team. There are no sources explaining how the name was given to the club. Presided by Norberto Tomaghello, Defensa y Justicia affiliated to Argentine Football Association, built its stadium, which was opened in occasion of a friendly match against Boca Juniors reserve team in December 1977.

The club's original colors were blue with white collars and cuffs, which were changed to yellow with green details. These were the colors of the bus line "El Halcón", a company that belonged to the club president at the time. This company used its buses to bring the fans to away games, and thus received the nickname "Los Halcones de Varela".

Even though the club was founded as early as 1935, Defensa y Justicia did not play in official tournaments until 1978, when the team debuted in Primera D, defeating Cañuelas 2–1. The starting line-up was: Ramón Correa; Benito López, Roberto Lucarini, Raúl Bustos, Alberto Cortez; Horacio Roselli, Jorge Giache, César Echeverry; Luis Briega, Héctor Cardozo, Oscar Bruno.

Defensa y Justicia played in Primera D until 1982 when the team won the championship and promoted to the upper division, Primera C. Only three years after, Defensa promoted again (this time to Primera B, the second division by then) after winning their second title. Defensa achieved promotion after beating Barracas Central 7–0. That same year, Defensa y Justicia played an "Octogonal", an 8-team tournament which winner promoted to Primera División.

After a 1–1 draw v Atlanta, the club promoted to recently created Primera B Nacional on 1 June 1986, achieving their second promotion within six months. In the first Primera B Nacional season, 1986–87, the team finished 10th. The following years Defensa would be relegated again, but the club returned to Primera B Nacional when winning the 1996–97 title in B Metro.

In 1998–99 season and coached by Ricardo Villa, Defensa was near to promote after eliminating Arsenal de Sarandí and Cipolletti, then losing to Chacarita Juniors (which would then promote along with champion Instituto 4–2 on aggregate. In 1999–2000 Defensa was coached by Jorge Burruchaga but could not qualify to "Torneo Reducido" (promotion and relegation playoff).

In 2014, Defensa y Justicia promoted to Primera División, the top division of Argentina, along with champion Banfield and Independiente. Defensa beat San Martín de San Juan 1–0 with goal by Brian Fernández. Coached by Diego Cocca, the starting line-up was: Diego Pellegrino; Cristian Báez, Juan Tejera, Emir Faccioli, Marcelo Benítez; Víctor Aguilera, Axel Juárez, Nelson Acevedo, Washington Camacho; Claudio Guerra,  Brian Fernández.

Defensa y Justicia debuted in Primera División on August 9, 2014 v Racing Club, being defeated 3–1. The team did not make a good performance, finishing 18th. out of 20 teams. On the other hand, Defensa had a better performance in Copa Argentina where they eliminated Godoy Cruz and San Lorenzo, but lost to Atlético de Rafaela in quarterfinals. In the next season, 2015 (contested by 30 teams due a restructuring of the tournament), Defensa y Justicia finished in the 21st position, with only 8 games won. 

In June 2015, Ariel Holan was appointed as coach in replacement of José Oscar Flores. It was the first tenure of Holan on a professional club in Primera Division after having worked in several coaching staffs such as Arsenal de Sarandí, Independiente, Estudiantes de La Plata. He had also worked with Matías Almeyda in River Plate. In 2015–16 Copa Argentina, Defensa eliminated Independiente in the second stage. Nevertheless, in 2016 Primera División season was one of the six teams to qualify to 2017 Copa Sudamericana, the first international competition where the club participated. The team advanced to second stage after eliminating Brazilian side São Paulo on away goal rule but then lost to Chapecoense on penalties after the series ended 1–1 on aggregate.

Being coached by Sebastián Beccacece, Defensa y Justicia made their first performance in 2018–19 Primera División season finishing 2nd. to champion Racing therefore qualifying for the 2020 Copa Libertadores group stage. Defensa completed the season with 15 wins, 8 draws and only 2 loses over 25 matches played with 33 goals scored and 18 against. In 2018 Copa Sudamericana, the club eliminated América de Cali and El Nacional qualifying to group stages, where it eliminated Banfield being then beat by Colombian side Junior on away goal rule after a 3–3 on aggregate.

Players

Squad

Out on loan

Managers

 Ricardo Zielinski (2002–03)
 Jorge Bermúdez (2010)
 Jorge Almirón (2012–13)
 Diego Cocca (2013–14)
 José Oscar Flores (2014–15)
 Ariel Holan (2015–16)
 Sebastián Beccacece (2016–17)
 Nelson Vivas (2017–18)
 Sebastián Beccacece (2018–19)
 Mariano Soso (2019–20)
 Hernán Crespo (2020–2021)
 Sebastián Beccacece (2021-2022)
 Julio Vaccari (2022-)

Honours

Domestic 
Primera B
Champions: 1996–97
Primera C
Champions: 1985
Primera D
Champions: 1982

International 
 Copa Sudamericana
Winners: 2020
 Recopa Sudamericana
Winners: 2021

References

External links

 

 
Association football clubs established in 1935
1935 establishments in Argentina
Football clubs in Buenos Aires Province
Copa Sudamericana winning clubs
Recopa Sudamericana winning clubs